Quebec is the eighth studio album by the American rock band Ween, released on August 5, 2003, on Sanctuary Records. It was the first album released after the band's contract with Elektra expired, and marked its return to independent labels.

On August 11, 2011, Dean Ween quietly released a two-disc, MP3-only collection of songs, The Caesar Demos, named after the band's original working title for Quebec—to friends on his Facebook page. In his comment, he stated the songs were all recorded between 2001 and 2003 while drummer Claude Coleman, Jr. was recovering from injuries sustained in a car accident, and that many of the tracks featured only himself and Gene. In addition to a handful of recordings that eventually made the album, the demos feature several alternate takes as well as a number of songs that have remained unreleased.

The album cover is an edited version of the packaging for the game Thorns from the 3M Paper Games series with the band superimposed on it.

Reception

Music critic Mark Prindle named Quebec the best album of the 2000s in an interview on Fox News Channel's Red Eye w/ Greg Gutfeld. Mojo named it the No. 39 best album of 2003. "CMJ" named it the No. 8 best album of 2003.

Track listing 
All tracks written by Ween.

The Caesar Demos 

The Caesar Demos is a compilation album released digitally for free trading by Dean Ween in 2011. It contains a combination of demo tracks from Quebec and songs recorded for the album that were cut prior to pressing. About the compilation Dean Ween (Mickey Melchiondo) wrote:
well what can i say about this here, lemme see. the first thing that comes to mind is that all the while we were doing this we still had claude coleman on drums, he eventually got into a major car wreck and wasn't around when it finally came time to make the "real" record. instead the drum duties fell on me, josh freese, and sim cain for a couple of tunes. almost all of this was recorded at our beach house in holgate, nj onto 16 track tape. a tiny bit of it was recorded in the garage behind aaron's house in pt. pleasant, pa. some of it was recorded in the spare bedroom of my house in new hope. most of the tunes are just me and aaron, with the two of us playing everything, with me on drums. the songs with claude, dave, and glenn are pretty obvious. on just a few tunes we took what you hear here and cleaned them up and had andrew weiss mix them for the record after some overdubs. dave sings on "it's gonna be a long night", this was days before he had surgery to remove polyps in his throat and his voice was really rough so we figured he was the guy for the job. This isn't even all of the tunes that we ended up choosing from, just the ones i happened to burn to cd before we drove home from the beach every week. hope you dig it for what it is.

Personnel

Ween 
 Gene Ween – vocals (all tracks except track 1), bass (tracks 2, 9 and 10), keyboard (tracks 2, 5, 7 and 13), acoustic guitar (track 4), synthesizer (track 4), drum machine (track 5), electric guitar (tracks 7, 9, 10, 13 and 14), omnichord (track 9)
 Dean Ween – vocals (track 1), electric guitar (all tracks), bass (tracks 1, 3-8 and 13-15), keyboard (track 2), electric sitar (tracks 3 and 6), vocoder (track 5)
 Andrew Weiss – synthesizer (tracks 9 and 15), percussion (track 2), strings (tracks 9 and 15), drums (track 6), keyboard (tracks 2, 3, 6 and 11), fretless bass (track 2)
 Glen McClelland – organ (tracks 1 and 15), piano (tracks 14 and 15), accordion (track 15), keyboard (tracks 3, 10 and 14)
 Dave Dreiwitz – bass, vocals (track 10)
 Sim Cain – drums (track 1)
 Josh Freese – drums (tracks 3, 7, 9, 10, 13, 14 and 15)

Production 
 Ween – arranger
 Andrew Weiss – producer, arranger, mixing
 Christopher Shaw – mixing
 Ted Young – mixing assistant
 Howie Weinberg – mastering

Charts

References 

2003 albums
Ween albums
Sanctuary Records albums
Neo-psychedelia albums